Chicago Blaze Rugby Football Club is a rugby union club based in Lemont, Illinois. The Blaze's first side competes in the Midwest Rugby Football Union's Division II class.

History
In 1982, the Windy City Nomads merged with the Amoco Rugby Club to form the Chicago Blaze Rugby Football Club. The new club would retain the colors blue for Amoco and red for Nomads. The first Blaze jerseys had the red and blue hoops.

Peter Thornley, one of the founding members and was instrumental to the Blaze future by bring together the two clubs and making what had been just an idea of being the first club team in the United States of America to actually own its own pitch. Before the creation of the clubhouse & field in 1990, the Blaze played at the forest preserve fields on 75th St and Rt 53 in Naperville, but community disapproval of the social aspect of post game celebrations, was what ultimately led the club to look into buying their own field.  Thornley, purchased a 9-acre farm on Smith Rd in 1984 for $89,000, but it would take another six years before the opening match in 1990 was played.

The club has hosted numerous Illinois State High School Championships, as well as CARFU Championships, and Midwest Territorial Championships.

Currently the club own 15 acres of land with three fields, with the main pitch having lights, locker room facilities, with showers, and a clubhouse with a bar for post-match socials, parties and events. Development continues with a play area for kids, spectator stands, horseshoe pit, and an ever-improving Rugby facility. The Blaze have traveled abroad on several international tours to England (1989), Ireland (1994), Spain (1999) and New Zealand (2002). Over the past years, the Blaze have won many Midwest Championships at Division 1 and 2 levels. The Blaze has competed in the National Championships in 1986, 1990, 1996, 2007, 2009, 2010, and 2011.

Thornley Field
Thornley Field consists of three pitches, the main one having lights, it is located in Lemont, Illinois at 13011 West Smith Road. The facilities include a clubhouse with a bar, locker room/team room, an equipment garage, outdoor pavilion and two parking lots. The fields underwent an upgrade in the mid-2000s with improved drainage and underground sprinkler system. The over-all property sits on just over 3 acres of land.

Club honors
 US Men's Division I & II Playoff Appearances: 1986, 1990, 1996, 2007, 2009, 2010, 2011 
 Division I National Final Four
Division II Midwest Champions: 1996
Division II National Sweet Sixteen 2007
Division II National Sweet Sixteen 2010
Division II National Sweet Sixteen 2011
 Mid-West Division II Final Four 2017
Division IV Midwest Champions 2019

Notable former players

References

External links
Official site

Blaze
Rugby clubs established in 1982
1982 establishments in Illinois